Whiston is a civil parish in Knowsley, Merseyside, England.  It contains ten buildings that are recorded in the National Heritage List for England as designated listed buildings, all of which are listed at Grade II.  This grade is the lowest of the three gradings given to listed buildings and is applied to "buildings of national importance and special interest".  The parish is partly residential, and partly rural.  The listed buildings include farmhouses and farm buildings, houses, structure sat the entrance to a former country house, a church, a milestone, and a railway bridge.

References

Citations

Sources

Listed buildings in Merseyside
Lists of listed buildings in Merseyside